Michalis Avgenikou (born 25 January 1993) is a Greek professional footballer who plays as a defensive midfielder for Super League 2 club Diagoras.

Career
Born in Pastida, Avgenikou began playing football with Asteras Pastidas. He then moved to local side Diagoras, playing for the club's U-20 before signing his first professional contract with the club in 2010. Within a span of two years, Avgenikou played in a total of 18 matches, scoring 1 goal. On 11 April 2012, he made his debut for the Greece U19 in a friendly match against Slovenia U19. On 30 June 2012, Avgenikou was acquired by Greek Superleague club PAS Giannina. He made a total of 26 appearances for the Epirus-based club during a three-year period. On 29 August 2015, Avgenikou signed a two-year contract with Football League club Ergotelis. He stayed with Ergotelis until January 2016, when the club announced its withdrawal from professional competitions due to unmanageable financial issues. Avgenikou was subsequently released from his contract, along with his fellow 16 teammates who chose to stay with the club until the very end, having made a total of 17 appearances during the season and having scored one goal. He then moved to fellow Cretan second-tier club Kissamikos.

References

External links
 
 onsports.gr

1993 births
Living people
Greek footballers
Greece youth international footballers
PAS Giannina F.C. players
Ergotelis F.C. players
PAS Lamia 1964 players
Rodos F.C. players
Irodotos FC players
Doxa Drama F.C. players
Association football defenders
English Football League players
Super League Greece players
People from Rhodes
Sportspeople from the South Aegean